Grounding is a topic in metaphysics. Consider an ordinary physical object, such as a table, and the atoms it is made of. Without the atoms, the table would not exist. The table's existence depends on the existence of the atoms. This kind of dependence is called "grounding" to distinguish it from other kinds of dependence, such as the dependence of an effect on its cause. It is sometimes called metaphysical or ontological dependence.

Grounding can be characterized as a relation between a ground and a grounded entity. The ground exists on a more fundamental level than the grounded entity, in the sense that the grounded entity depends for its existence or its properties on its ground. According to the neo-Aristotelian approach to ontology, the goal of ontology is to determine which entities are fundamental and how the non-fundamental entities depend on them.

Overview
A distinction is typically made between grounding relations and other dependence relations, such as causation or realization. Grounding is often considered to be a form of non-causal determination or priority.

According to some in favor of the idea, things which are less fundamental are grounded in things that are more fundamental. Here's an example. Many people say that physical particles are more fundamental than tables, cats, mountains and other large, composite objects. Some say that, for this reason, physical particles ground large, composite objects. Or, they say that facts about physical particles ground facts about large, composite objects. This is then said to account for the direction of explanation: the reason why a given large, composite object exists is because of facts about the particles.

In chess, for example, if the king is in checkmate, this situation holds because the king is in check and has no legal moves. The fact that the king is in checkmate depends on the fact that the king is in check and has no legal moves. In other words, the first fact is grounded in the second fact.

As another example, consider the property of being either even or prime. The number 4 has this property because it is even. Here "because" does not express a causal relation (where the cause precedes the effect in time). It expresses a grounding relation. The fact that the number 4 is even or prime is grounded in the fact that 4 is even. In other words, the first fact obtains in virtue of the second fact.

Role in neo-Aristotelian ontology
According to the neo-Aristotelian approach to ontology, the goal of ontology is to determine which entities are fundamental and how the non-fundamental entities depend on them. Fundamentality can be expressed in terms of grounding. For example, according to Aristotle, substances have the highest degree of fundamentality because they exist in themselves. Properties, on the other hand, are less fundamental because they depend on substances for their existence. In this example, properties are grounded in substances.

Role in truthmaker theory
The notion of grounding has been used to analyze the relation between truthmakers and truthbearers. The basic idea is that truthbearers (like beliefs, sentences or propositions) are not intrinsically true or false but that their truth depends on something else. For example, the belief that water freezes at 0 °C is true in virtue of the fact that water freezes at 0 °C. In this example, the freezing-fact is the truthmaker of the freezing-belief. Expressed in terms of grounding: the truth of the freezing-belief is grounded in the existence of the freezing-fact.

References

External links 
 
 Schaffer, Jonathan. "On What Grounds What." In David Manley, David J. Chalmers & Ryan Wasserman (eds.), Metametaphysics: New Essays on the Foundations of Ontology. Oxford University Press. pp. 347–383 (2009)
 Grounding. Bibliography edited by Kelly Trogdon 
 Metaphysical Grounding: Annotated Bibliography edited by Raul Corazzon

Concepts in metaphysics